The 2004 Arizona Diamondbacks looked to improve on their 84–78 record from 2003. The D-backs hoped to contend for a postseason berth in what was a weaker National League West Division than in years past. However, just three years removed from winning a World Series title, the Diamondbacks instead finished the season with a record of 51–111, the worst record by any National League team since the 1965 Mets won one fewer game. The one highlight of a disastrous season was when Randy Johnson pitched a perfect game on May 18, 2004. The franchise record would not be threatened until 2021, when they finished 52–110. Despite the 110-loss season in 2021, the Diamondbacks didn't earn the first overall pick in the 2022 MLB Draft, as the Baltimore Orioles finished with a 52–110 record, but were worse due to records against American League opponents.

Offseason
 November 28, 2003: Curt Schilling was traded by the Diamondbacks to the Boston Red Sox for Casey Fossum, Brandon Lyon, Jorge de la Rosa, and Michael Goss (minors).
 November 29, 2003: Jesse Orosco was signed as a free agent with the Diamondbacks.
 December 1, 2003: Lyle Overbay, Chris Capuano, Craig Counsell, Chad Moeller, Jorge de la Rosa, and Junior Spivey were traded by the Diamondbacks to the Milwaukee Brewers for Richie Sexson, Shane Nance and a player to be named later. The Brewers completed the deal by sending Noochie Varner (minors) to the Diamondbacks on December 15.
 December 4, 2003: Félix José was signed as a free agent by the Diamondbacks.
 December 15, 2003: Quinton McCracken was traded by the Diamondbacks to the Seattle Mariners for Greg Colbrunn and cash.
 December 18, 2003: Brent Mayne was signed as a free agent by the Diamondbacks.
 February 25, 2004: Bobby Estalella was signed as a free agent by the Diamondbacks.
 February 25, 2004: Scott Service was signed as a free agent by the Diamondbacks.

Regular season

Opening Day lineup

Season standings

National League West

Record vs. opponents

Notable transactions
 June 11, 2004: Quinton McCracken was signed as a free agent by the Diamondbacks.
 July 31, 2004: Steve Finley and Brent Mayne were traded by the Diamondbacks to the Los Angeles Dodgers in exchange for Reggie Abercrombie (minors), Koyie Hill and Bill Murphy.
 August 19, 2004: Elmer Dessens was traded by the Diamondbacks to the Los Angeles Dodgers in exchange for Jereme Milons (minors).

Roster

Player stats

Batting

Starters by position
Note: Pos = Position; G = Games played; AB = At bats; H = Hits; Avg. = Batting average; HR = Home runs; RBI = Runs batted in

Other batters
Note: G = Games played; AB = At bats; H = Hits; Avg. = Batting average; HR = Home runs; RBI = Runs batted in

Pitching

Starting pitchers
Note: G = Games pitched; GS = Games started; IP = Innings pitched; W = Wins; L = Losses; ERA = Earned run average; SO = Strikeouts

Other pitchers
Note: G = Games pitched; IP = Innings pitched; W = Wins; L = Losses; ERA = Earned run average; SO = Strikeouts

Relief pitchers
Note: G = Games pitched; W = Wins; L = Losses; SV = Saves; ERA = Earned run average; SO = Strikeouts

Farm system

References

External links
 Arizona Diamondbacks official web site 
2004 Arizona Diamondbacks at Baseball Reference
 2004 Arizona Diamondbacks team page at www.baseball-almanac.com

Arizona Diamondbacks Season, 2004
Arizona Diamondbacks seasons
Arizonia